Calochrominae is a subfamily of net-winged beetles in the family Lycidae. There are at least 4 genera and more than 30 described species in Calochrominae.

Tribes and genera
BioLib includes two tribes and the following genera in the subfamily Calochrominae:
Calochromini Lacordaire, 1857
 Calochromus Guérin-Ménéville, 1833
 Caloptognatha Green, 1954
 Dumbrellia Lea, 1909
 Lucaina Dugès, 1879
 Lygistopterus Mulsant, 1838
 Macrolygistopterus Pic, 1929
Slipinskiini Bocák & Bocáková, 1992
 Aferos Kasantsev, 1992

References

Further reading

External links

Lycidae
Articles created by Qbugbot